Josef Hahnenkamp (born 19 July 1962) is an Austrian sports shooter. He competed at the 1988 Summer Olympics and the 1992 Summer Olympics.

References

1962 births
Living people
Austrian male sport shooters
Olympic shooters of Austria
Shooters at the 1988 Summer Olympics
Shooters at the 1992 Summer Olympics
Sportspeople from Baden bei Wien
20th-century Austrian people